Mariann Grammofon or Mariann Records, formed in 1972 was a record company run by Bert Karlsson in Skara, Sweden. Since May 2006 the label is owned by Warner Music Group which still, as of 2016, releases music using the label.

The label was sold following changes in music industry during the previous years.

Signed artists and groups 

 Afro-Dite
 Alf Robertson
 Anders Johansson
 Andrés Esteche
 Barbados
 Carola Häggkvist
 Casanovas
 Christina Lindberg
 Curt Haagers
 Date
 Drängarna
 Eddie Meduza
 Emil Sigfridsson
 Fame
 Flamingokvintetten
 Grönwalls
 Herreys
 Janne Lucas Persson
 Jigs
 Jimmy Jansson
 Johan Stengård
 Joyride
 Karl Martindahl
 Kellys
 Kikki Danielsson
 Lena Philipsson (until 1989)
 Linda Bengtzing
 Lotta Engberg
 Maja Gullstrand
 Martin Nilsson
 Martinez
 Mathias Holmgren
 Mats Bergmans
 Mats Rådberg & Rankarna
 Matz Bladhs
 Matz Stefanz med Lailaz
 Merit Hemmingsson
 Michael Michailoff
 Noice
 Peter Glyt
 Sandra Dahlberg
 Sara Löfgren
 Schytts
 Simson duPont
 Snowstorm
 Streaplers
 The Wallstones
 Towe Widerbergs
 Ultima Thule
 Wizex

See also 

 List of record labels

References

1972 establishments in Sweden
Record labels established in 1972
Swedish record labels